Dataproducts Corporation was an early manufacturer of computer peripheral equipment.

Overview
Initially known as Data Products, the company was founded by Erwin Tomash in 1962 in order to take controlling interest of Telex's Data Systems Division. The division was behind on a contract to deliver disk drives to General Electric. Dataproducts was able to complete the product and deliver to GE and later Ferranti, ICL and RCA.

Sustained by the disk drive business and Informatics, Data Products began development of their first line printer. Introduced in 1963, the 3300 was a 300 line per minute drum printer that used a moving coil actuator for the print hammer.

In 1966, core memory was added to the product line. With heightened sales and earnings, Data Products moved to a new site in Woodland Hills, Los Angeles, California in 1968. They started acquiring other businesses, including Staff Dynamics, a personnel agency and Uptime, a manufacturer of card readers. Graham Tyson replaced Tomash as CEO in 1971. The disk business was ailing in the face of increased competition and finally discontinued.

Dataproducts switched from drum to band technology in the late 1970s and added dot matrix printers along with a series of thermal printers sourced from Olivetti. The telecommunications company Stelma was purchased and Data Card was formed to manufacture plastic card embossing equipment.

Daisy wheel printers were added to the line with a purchase of the business from Plessey in 1978. A joint project with Exxon yielded a series of solid ink printers. The Exxon printer division was Danbury Systems Division where 6 members were hired by Howtek, Inc, the company producing the Pixelmaster Solid ink Color printer. Howtek was sued by Dataproducts over the use of hot-melt ink. This delayed shipment of the Howtek Pixelmaster for about 2 years or until 1986 and also increased the manufacturing cost of the product even though the suit was dropped by Dataproducts. Howtek was in negotiations with Apple for this color printer at the time.   Dataproducts used Toshiba engines for their first laser printers in 1989.

Legal battles with Tektronix and Apple over the solid ink patents drained resources and ended with Apple discontinuing their product and Tektronix paying royalties. Jack C. Davis, 47, a former Harris Corporation senior vice president, replaced Graham Tyson as chairman and chief executive in May, 1986. By 1989, net income had dropped from a high of $27.7 million to $3.8 million, and Dataproducts fought off takeover attempts by a consortium. Dataproducts was purchased by Hitachi Koki Co. Ltd., a unit of Hitachi in 1990.

Dataproducts later used Fuji Xerox engines for their Typhoon series of laser printers. The LZR1560/1580 was OEMed as the Apple LaserWriter Pro 810 in 1993. In 1998, the LZR 5200 continuous feed laser printer was announced.

The Dataproducts brand name was used until it was formed into Hitachi Koki Imaging Systems in 1999.

Clover Technologies Group, LLC (Clover) of Ottawa, Illinois, acquired the North American and European compatible printing supplies divisions of Ricoh Printing Systems America, Inc. (RPSA), manufacturer of Dataproducts and other compatible supplies brands, effective February 1, 2005, as announced by CEO Jim Schiefelbein and President Jim Cerkleski. Bill Barclay, former executive vice president of the RPSA supplies division, was named president of the new Dataproducts USA, LLC division of Clover. Financing for the acquisition was provided by Bank One.

World headquarters of Clover Technologies Group is in Ottawa, Illinois, along with its manufacturing and distribution facilities. Dataproducts division, with its western U.S. distribution center, is located in Simi Valley, California, with manufacturing in Mexicali, Mexico and in Porto, Portugal. The three plants provide over 200,000 square feet of combined manufacturing capacity of printer, fax and copier consumables.

There is a simple "memorial" Facebook page online; memories, contributions etc. are welcome on that page.

Informatics

When Dataproducts was first formed, Informatics was created as a subsidiary that did contract software work and was headed by Walter F. Bauer. In 1964, Informatics acquired Advanced Information Systems from Hughes Dynamics. The AIS file management system led to MARK IV, a fourth-generation programming language that was the first software product to have cumulative sales of $10 million and later $100 million. DataProducts spun Informatics off as a public corporation in 1968. Beginning in 1983, Sterling Software made an unsolicited offer that became a takeover attempt and finally resulted in a merger in 1985.

References

External links
 Oral history interviews with  founders of Dataproducts, Charles Babbage Institute, University of Minnesota. Interviewees include Arnold J. Ryden, who purchased Telex and did a spinoff of the data products division; Willis K. Drake, Erwin Tomash, Chester Irwin Lappen, the co-founders of Dataproducts; and Adelle Tomash.
 Oral history interview with Walter F. Bauer, Charles Babbage Institute, University of Minnesota. In 1962 Bauer, Werner Frank, Richard Hill, and Frank Wagner started Informatics General Corporation as a wholly owned subsidiary of Dataproducts. Bauer discusses the corporate structure, business strategies, and products of Informatics General.
 Oral history interview with Sam Wyly, Charles Babbage Institute, University of Minnesota, by David Allison, December 6, 2002. Wyly discusses his formation of Sterling Software and its acquisition of Informatics.
 Erwin Tomash Collection of Dataproducts Corporation Records (1962-82), Charles Babbage Institute, University of Minnesota. Original business plan, publications, reports, organizational charts and employee lists, articles, and correspondence that document the company's growth and market position in printers and core memories.

American companies established in 1962
American companies disestablished in 1990
Computer companies established in 1962
Computer companies disestablished in 1990
Computer printer companies
Defunct computer companies of the United States
Defunct companies based in Greater Los Angeles